

The surname
Griffiths is a surname with Welsh origins, as in Gruffydd ap Llywelyn Fawr. People called Griffiths recorded here include:
 Alan Griffiths (born 1952), Australian politician and businessman
 Alan Griffiths (cricketer) (born 1957), English cricketer
 Andrew Griffiths (disambiguation), several people
 Anne Griffiths (1932–2017), personal archivist of the Duke of Edinburgh
 Antony Griffiths (born 1951), British museum curator and art historian
 Barri Griffiths (born 1982), Welsh professional wrestler and former Gladiators competitor
 Barry Griffiths (Australian footballer) (born 1929), Australian rules footballer
 Barry Griffiths (footballer, born 1940), association football goalkeeper
 Bede Griffiths  (1906–1993), British-born monk and missionary in India
 Bryn (Brynlyn) Griffiths, Welsh poet and writer
 Cecil Griffiths (1901–1945), British athlete
 Charles Griffiths (politician), Australian politician
 Colin Griffiths (born 1983), English comedian, DJ, VJ and writer
 Ciarán Griffiths (born 1983), British actor, currently in Shameless
 Dan Griffiths (rugby union, born 1857) (1857–1936), Welsh rugby union forward
 Dan Griffiths (rugby union, born 1979), Welsh rugby union fly-half
 David Griffiths (disambiguation), several people
 Dean Griffiths (born 1980), Jamaican hurdler
 Derek Griffiths (born 1946), British actor
 Dewi Griffiths (born 1931), Welsh television producer and radio host
 Eddie Griffiths, Australian fire fighter, World War I veteran and rugby league footballer
 Eliezer Griffiths (1827–1920), a Welsh Congregationalist minister in Australia
 Elly Griffiths (born 1963), British author
 Estyn Griffths (born 1927), Welsh footballer
 Frances Griffiths: see Cottingley Fairies
 Franny Griffiths, English musician, member of the band Space
 Fred Griffiths (rugby league), South African rugby league footballer
 Fred Griffiths (actor) (1912–1994), British actor
 Gwenny Griffiths (1867–1953), Welsh painter
 H. W. Griffiths (Henry W. Griffiths Jr.), Idaho railroad photographer
 Howard Griffiths (disambiguation), several people
 Ivor Griffiths (1918–1993), Welsh footballer
 Jemma Griffiths (1975–), better known as Jem, Welsh singer-songwriter
 Jennie Scott Griffiths (1875-1951) American, Fijian, and Australian journalist and women's rights activist
 Joel Griffiths (1979–), Australian soccer
 John Griffiths (disambiguation), several people
 Käthe Bosse-Griffiths (1910–1998), German born Egyptologist and writer in the Welsh language
 Ken Griffiths (1930–2008), English footballer
 Ken Griffiths (photographer) (1945–2014), New Zealand born photographer
 Leigh Griffiths, Scottish footballer
 Linda Griffiths (1953–2014), Canadian actor and playwright
 Louise Griffiths, pop singer, songwriter and actress
 Lucy Griffiths (actress, born 1919)
 Lucy Griffiths (actress, born 1986)
 Marcia Griffiths (1949–) Jamaican singer
 M. A. Griffiths (1947–2009), British poet
 Maurice Griffiths (1902–1997), English yachtsman, boat designer and writer on sailing subjects
 Mike Griffiths (born 1962), Welsh international rugby player
 Mike Griffiths (police officer), English police officer
 Niall Griffiths (born 1966), English author
 Peter Griffiths, English politician
 Philip Jones Griffiths (1936–2008), Welsh photojournalist 
 Philip Lewis Griffiths (1881–1945), Australian jurist
 Phillip Griffiths (born 1938), American mathematician
 Rachel Griffiths (born 1968), Australian actress
 Ralph Griffiths, eighteenth-century editor and publisher
 Rhys Griffiths (footballer)
 Rhys Griffiths (rugby league)
 Richard Griffiths (1947–2013), British actor
 Robert Griffiths (disambiguation), several people
 Rowland Griffiths (1886–1914), Wales international rugby union player
 Ryan Griffiths (guitarist) (1978–)
 Sarah Griffiths (born 2001), English singer and songwriter known professionally as Griff
 Sandi Griffiths (born 1945), American singer
 Selina Griffiths, British actress
 Stan Griffiths (1911–2003), Welsh footballer
 Terry Griffiths (born 1947), retired Welsh snooker player 
 Terry Griffiths (politician) (1944–2009), New South Wales politician
 Trevor Griffiths (born 1935), English dramatist
 Tuffy Griffiths, boxer
 Walter Griffiths (footballer), English footballer
 William Griffiths (disambiguation), several people
 Wyn Griffiths (1919–2006), Welsh footballer
 Osmond Griffiths (policeman), Grenadain policeman
 Khashia Griffiths

Other uses 
Griffiths may also refer to one of three textbooks by David J. Griffiths:
 Introduction to Electrodynamics
 Introduction to Quantum Mechanics
 Introduction to Particle Physics

See also
 Griffith (name)
 Griffith (surname)
 Griffith (disambiguation)
 Griffin (disambiguation)
 Griffiths Island

Surnames of Welsh origin
Patronymic surnames